Carlos Ilídio Moreno Gomes (born 7 December 1970), known as Piguita, is a Cape Verdean retired footballer who played as a central defender.

Club career
Piguita was born in Praia. He arrived in Portugal at the age of 22 from Sporting Clube da Praia, suffering two consecutive Primeira Liga relegations with F.C. Famalicão and S.C. Beira-Mar.

After one year in the third division with Portimonense SC, Piguita signed for S.C. Covilhã in the second level. He went on to remain with the club for 11 years, appearing in nearly 300 competitive matches and achieving three promotions to division two.

Piguita retired at nearly 40, after three seasons with four teams in Portuguese amateur football.

References

External links

1970 births
Living people
Sportspeople from Praia
Cape Verdean footballers
Association football defenders
Sporting Clube da Praia players
Primeira Liga players
Liga Portugal 2 players
Segunda Divisão players
F.C. Famalicão players
S.C. Beira-Mar players
Portimonense S.C. players
S.C. Covilhã players
S.C. Lusitânia players
Cape Verdean expatriate footballers
Expatriate footballers in Portugal
Cape Verdean expatriate sportspeople in Portugal